Architecture of Australia has generally been consistent with architectural trends in the wider Western world, with some special adaptations to compensate for distinctive Australian climatic and cultural factors. Indigenous Australians produced a wide range of structures and places prior to colonisation. Contemporary Indigenous practitioners are active in a broad range of built environment fields. During Australia's early Western history, it was a collection of British colonies in which architectural styles were strongly influenced by British designs. However, the unique climate of Australia necessitated adaptations, and 20th-century trends reflected the increasing influence of American urban designs and a diversification of the cultural tastes and requirements of an increasingly multicultural Australian society.

Notable Australian architectural adaptations include the Queenslander and Federation styles of residential architecture. Iconic Australian designs include the UNESCO listed Sydney Opera House, Melbourne Royal Exhibition Building, Brisbane City Hall and the 11 remnant penal colony sites selected for World Heritage protection in 2010.

History

In the period before European settlement of Australia, there were diverse forms of Indigenous architecture across Australia. The rich architecture traditions of Aboriginal and Torres Strait Islander peoples generally went unrecognised, and when it was recognised generally downplayed by the European Settlers. However, many early colonists and explorers including  Sir Thomas Mitchell and Charles Sturt recorded many Indigenous building styles including stone houses and houses grouped in villages. As a British colony, the first European buildings were derivative of the European fashions of the time.  As most of the colonialists where from England the first buildings reflected English ideas.

Georgian architecture is seen in early government buildings and the homes of the wealthy. The architect Francis Greenway, who appears on the Australian ten-dollar note designed early buildings in the Georgian style.  Examples include the Hyde Park Barracks, St James' Church and St Matthews Church at Windsor.

Another European style to gain favour in 19th century Australia, particularly in churches, was Gothic Revival architecture. Pointed arches, turrets, battlements and gothic ornaments could also be found on bank, insurance offices, university buildings and homes. One of the best examples of this style can be seen at the lower end of Collins Street in Melbourne.

With the Australian gold rushes of the mid-19th-century major buildings, largely in Melbourne and Sydney and to a lesser extent in regional capitals such as Ballarat and Bendigo were built in the style of Victorian architecture. From about 1850 to 1893 Italianate architecture was also popular as it allowed greater displays of prosperity through rich and ornate decorate features such as cast iron lace work and slate roofs.  Towards the end of the century the style was pushed to an extreme by some architects.  Buildings became over-burdened with excess columns, balustrades, exaggerated entrances and other lavish decorations.  Medley Hall in Carlton is an example of this style which became known as the Boom Style from 1880 to 1893.

One of the most significant architectural movements in Australian architecture was the Federation architecture style of the turn of the 20th century, where Australia began to play with the idea of a "style of our own", and the modern styles of the late 20th century which sought to reject historicism.

Walter Burley Griffin was an American architect and landscape architect who, with fellow architect Marion Mahony Griffin, played a key role in designing Canberra, Australia's capital city. A legacy of their unique architecture remains in a small number of Melbourne buildings and the Sydney suburb of Castlecrag. Castlecrag was planned by the Griffins and also features a number of houses designed in the organic Modernist style they developed after the Prairie School architecture that marked his earlier career in the United States.  The simple, flat-roofed cottages that the Griffins designed in Canberra used their innovative, patented techniques for concrete construction.

One of the most important local introduction to Australian architecture was the verandah.  As pastoralists took up land and built solid, single story dwellings the addition of verandahs proved popular as they provided shade and looked attractive.  They were often integrated into the symmetry of Georgian style homes.

Like elsewhere in the world, socio-political factors have played their roles in shaping Australian architecture. During the early 20th century, cities across Australia had placed building height limits, typically 150 feet (45 m), thus hampering the development of American-style skyscrapers until the limits were lifted in the late 1950s. Likewise the popular notion of the "Australian Dream", in which families seek to own their free-standing houses with backyards, meant that high-density housings were rare in Australia until the end of the 20th century. The design of housing in Australia after World War II, which was mostly undertaken by builders, has been described as poor aesthetically and environmentally.

Significant concern was raised during the 1960s, with green bans and heritage concerns responding to the destruction of earlier buildings and the skyscraper boom, particularly in Sydney and Melbourne, but affecting other major cities including Adelaide, Perth and Brisbane. Green bans helped to protect historic 18th-century buildings in The Rocks from being demolished to make way for office towers, and prevented the Royal Botanic Gardens from being turned into a carpark for the Sydney Opera House.  In Melbourne a battle was fought to preserve historic Carlton, Victoria from slum reclamation for public housing, while gentrification played a big part in the suburb's salvation. In Melbourne's city centre, the destruction was particularly profound: Whelan the Wrecker was a family owned and operated demolition company that operated from 1892 until 1992, which became well known through the 1950s, 70s and 80s when signs stating that "Whelan the Wrecker is Here" appeared on many of the grand Victorian era buildings of Marvellous Melbourne. One of the most lamented losses in Melbourne was the Federal Coffee Palace on Collins Street and the APA Building (inspired by Chicago's early skyscrapers) at 49 Elizabeth Street. Many of the destruction occurred after the International Modernism style arrived in Australia, making Australians particularly conscious about Victorian architecture they felt was "dated".

In the 21st century, many Australian architects have taken a more avant-garde approach to design, and many buildings have emerged that are truly unique and reflective of Australia's culture and values.  As a result, many Australian practices are beginning to expand their influence overseas rather than the reverse which was often the case. Melbourne is seen as the city at the forefront of design ideas.  Sydney is focusing on the humanist approach tending towards minimalism and architecture in Queensland is interested in outdoor rooms and the filtering of light. Furthermore, greater appreciation for Australia's historic architecture has led to increased heritage protection for many buildings in Australia's cities, though not all buildings are protected, and some allow for façadism if the interior is unsustainable or unsafe.

Australian architectural styles

 
Architectural styles have been basically exotic and derivative. Only recently have climate and environment played a major role.

During the 19th century, Australian architects were inspired by developments in England. From the 1930s on, North American and International influences started to appear.

Buildings were often heavily influenced by the origins of their patrons, hence while the British would like to be reminded of their Gothic churches and Tudoresque cottages of a perfect England, the Dutch, German, Polish, Greek, Italian and other nationalities would also attempt to recreate the architecture of their homelands.

Gallery

Victorian

Post-modernism

Residential

Australian architects

Significant architects include:
Robin Boyd
John James Clark
Francis Greenway
Roy Grounds
Neville Gruzman
Harry Howard
Bryce Mortlock
Glenn Murcutt
John Horbury Hunt
Nonda Katsalidis
Joseph Reed
Harry Seidler
Walter Liberty Vernon
Mortimer Lewis
George McRae
Howard Joseland
James Barnet
Lily Isabel Maude Addison
Edmund Blacket
Beverley Ussher
Muir and Shepherd
Amir Válá Meshkin
Ruth Alsop
 Brit Andresen
Beverley Bolin 
 Eva Buhrich 
 Stroma Buttrose 
 Kerry and Lindsay Clare
 Louise Cox 
 Eleanor Cullis-Hill 
 Suzanne Dance
 Maggie Edmond 
 Rosina Edmunds 
 Zahava Elenberg 
 Cassandra Fahey 
 Margaret Feilman
 Margaret Findlay
 Abbie Galvin
 Jill Garner
 Eli Giannini 
 Eileen Good 
 Kristin Green
 Marion Mahony Griffin 
Winsome Hall Andrew 
 Laura Harding 
 Ellison Harvie 
 Beatrice Hutton 
 Louise St John Kennedy 
 Helen Lochhead
 Bill and Ruth Lucas 
 Kirsteen Mackay
 Kooi-Ying Mah 
 Nellie McCredie 
 Margaret Pitt Morison 
 Elina Mottram 
 Phyllis Murphy 
 Andrea Nield
 Ellice Nosworthy
 Alexis Ord
 Shelley Penn 
 Christine Phillips
 Susan Phillips 
 Caroline Pidcock 
 Kelly Rattigan 
 Dimity Reed 
 Penelope Seidler 
 Mary Turner Shaw 
 Muriel Stott 
 Florence Mary Taylor 
 Jennifer Taylor 
 Cynthia Teague 
 Kerstin Thompson (
 Yvonne von Hartel 
 Emma Young

Significant firms include:
Ashton Raggatt McDougall
Bates Smart
Lyons (architecture firm)
Searle x Waldron
Kennedy Nolan

Notable structures

There are many notable structures, of particular importance are:
the Sydney Opera House, original design being by Jørn Utzon (UNESCO World Heritage)
the Brisbane City Hall
the Royal Exhibition Building in Melbourne (UNESCO World Heritage)
Federation Square, Melbourne
Parliament House, Canberra
Sydney Harbour Bridge

See also

Urban planning in Australia

References

External links
Australian Institute of Architects (AIA)
Australian Architects under World Architects www.world-architects.com
ArchitectureAU - online repository of Architecture Australia, the magazine of the Australian Institute of Architects
Australian Design Review
Gallery of Australian Architecture
Gallery of Federation Architecture
Gallery of Sydney Architecture
Australian Architects